Giovanni Bertacchi (Chiavenna, 9 February 1869 - Milan, 24 November 1942) was a poet, teacher and Italian literary critic.

Biography 
His poetry was heavily influenced by Giovanni Pascoli, both in terms of the search for metric forms and the characteristic taste for landscape descriptions.

He was a professor of Italian literature at the University of Padua from 1916 to 1938 when he voluntarily left the teaching position against fascism.

He was the author of critical studies on Dante, Leopardi, Manzoni, Alfieri, Mazzini. His first and perhaps most important poetic work is the Canzoniere delle Alpi, published in 1895. About 60 years, in conjunction with the release of his latest collection Il perenne domani (The Perennial Tomorrow). These were pervaded by the nostalgia for childhood and for its places of origin.

He was buried in the cemetery of Chiavenna, a sarcophagus created by Enrico Pancera.

Main works

Critical studies 
 Ore dantesche (1914) 
 Leopardi un maestro di vita (1917) - Leopards a Master of Life
 Il primo romanticismo lombardo (1920) - The first Lombard romance
 Il pensiero critico e le tragedie di A. Manzoni (1936) - The critical thought and tragedies of A. Manzoni

Verse stories 
 Il canzoniere delle Alpi, Milano, Chiesa e Guindani (1895) - The songwriter of the Alps , Milan, Church and Guindani
 Poemetti lirici, Milano, Sonzogno (1898) - Poetry lyric , Milan, Sonzogno
 Le malie del passato, Milano, Libreria editrice lombarda, (1905) - The Mountains of the Past , Milan, Lombard Publishing House
 Alle sorgenti, Milano, Baldini e Castoldi, (1906) - At the sources , Milan, Baldini & Castoldi
 A fior di silenzio, Milano, Baldini e Castoldi (1912) - A silent flower , Milan, Baldini and Castoldi
 Riflessi di orizzonti, Milano, Baldini e Castoldi, (1921) - Reflections of horizons , Milan, Baldini and Castoldi
 Il perenne domani, Milano, Baldini e Castoldi, (1929) -

Other works 
 Suona la sveglia (1921), inno ufficiale del Corpo nazionale giovani esploratori ed esploratrici italiani
 Marmi, vessilli ed eroi (orazioni, commemorazioni, ecc.), Milano, Baldini e Castoldi (1912)
 Voci dal mondo: antologia della lingua italiana, Torino, Paravia, 1926.

Notes 
 Mario Borsa, Giovanni Bertacchi negli anni della sua giovinezza, Varese, 1943.
 Luigi Medici, Giovanni Bertacchi, maestro di bontà, Milano, Baldini e Castoldi, 1946.
 Arturo Graf, Anime di poeti, in «Nuova Antologia», Torino, 1º aprile 1904.
 Emilio Cecchi, Studi critici, Ancona, 1912.
 Giovanni Papini, Testimonianze, Firenze, Vallecchi, 1924, pp. 55–70.
 Alfredo Galletti, Il Novecento, Milano, Vallardi, 1939, pp. 256–260.
 Francesco Flora, I nostri morti, in «Corriere d'informazione», Milano, 20 novembre 1945.
 Enrico Maria Fusco, La lirica, Milano, Vallardi, 1950, volume 2°, pp. 297–300.
 Ettore Mazzoli, Giovanni Bertacchi, in Letteratura italiana - I Minori, volume 4°, Milano, Marzorati, 1962, pp. 3427–3439
 Luisa Mangoni, Giovanni Bertacchi, « Dizionario Biografico degli Italiani », vol. 9, Roma, Istituto dell'Enciclopedia italiana, 1967
 Dizionario della letteratura italiana a cura di Ettore Bonora, Milano, Rizzoli,I, 1977

References 

1869 births
1942 deaths
Italian poets
University of Padua alumni
People from Chiavenna